Lecithocera adelella is a moth in the family Lecithoceridae. It was described by Francis Walker in 1864. It is found on Borneo.

Adults are dark purplish, the forewings with a silvery white fringe. The hindwings are purplish cupreous.

References

Moths described in 1864
adelella